Justin Wong, occasionally shortened to just Jwong, is a formerly American and now Canadian professional fighting game player.

Wong has won more EVO titles than anyone else with nine tournaments won: seven for Marvel vs. Capcom 2: New Age of Heroes between 2001 and 2010, one for Street Fighter III: 3rd Strike in 2009, and one for Ultimate Marvel vs. Capcom 3 in 2014.

Career

Evolution 2004

In the Evolution Championship Series 2004 Street Fighter III: 3rd Strike losers bracket final, Wong's Chun-Li lost to Daigo Umehara's Ken Masters when, in an unexpected comeback, Daigo managed to parry every single hit of Chun-Li's super art II and land a max damage combo. This incident has been widely shared in a well-known viral video.

2009
Wong took part in GameStop's Street Fighter IV US National Tournament in 2009, which he won. After the main tournament, a set of special exhibition matches of Street Fighter IV took place in San Francisco, California, on April 18 after the actual competition ended. It featured Iyo who had recently won the Japanese National SFIV tournament, Poongko who won the Korean SFIV National Tournament, and Daigo Umehara who came by Capcom's invitation, and Wong himself. Wong defeated Iyo and Poongko, but lost to Umehara who went on to win the tournament. He was awarded a tournament seed at Evolution 2009 in Las Vegas.

Wong gained more fame after the footage of his matches in GameStop's competition were spread on the internet. As of July 19, 2009, the video of the match against Umehara received almost 80,000 hits on Niconico video sharing site.

Evolution 2009
For winning the US GameStop tournament, Wong started his Street Fighter IV competition as a seeded player in the semi-finals on July 18, which is the second day of Evo 2009. He beat four opponents and had to start the next day by playing against Daigo Umehara. In the third and the last day, Umehara defeated Wong and put him into the Losers Bracket, then advanced to the grand finals just to meet Wong again. In the final showdown, Wong changed his character from Abel to Balrog (boxer, called M. Bison in Japan) to counter Umehara's signature Ryu. The two fought until the last game possible, but Wong lost the competition. It was this point of the tournament that had more than 23,000 users viewing the stream broadcasting.

Seasons Beatings IV
Wong joined a tournament called Seasons Beatings on October 16–18 in Columbus, Ohio. He participated in the Street Fighter IV 3 on 3 on the second day with two teammates and won 1st place. There was an exhibition match between him and Daigo Umehara which he lost by two games to ten. For Street Fighter IV Singles, Justin, who this time chose to play Fei Long, won in the Winners Bracket's final against Umehara. He later lost to Umehara after Umehara bounced back from the Loser's Bracket.

2010
In June 2010, Wong left the competitive gaming group Empire Arcadia and signed with professional gaming organization Evil Geniuses with Martin "Marn" Phan and was later joined by Ricki Ortiz.

Evolution 2010
Wong won the Marvel vs Capcom 2 tournament coming out of the loser's bracket. He also placed just out of the top 8 in Super Street Fighter IV, losing to Bruce "Gamerbee" Hsiang.

Wong also participated in the reality show WCG Ultimate Gamer. He made it as far as the Gauntlet (series of semi-final elimination challenges), but was eliminated during the Forza Motorsport 3 driving challenge.

2011

PDP.com's Mortal Kombat Nationals
Wong stormed through the tournament without losing a set up until the grand finals where he won the tournament and the $10,000 1st prize using Kung Lao, playing against Floe's Ermac in the finals.

2015
In 2015, Wong was announced be participating in the Red Bull Kumite 2016 Street Fighter V invitational tournament.

Personal life
Justin's engagement to Jacqueline Kwan was announced on July 28, 2018, and they have a daughter, Harper Wong. Justin Wong attended Murry Bergtraum High School for Business Careers and was often seen at the world-famous Chinatown Fair in Chinatown, Manhattan, where he would be seen playing Marvel VS Capcom 2 and sometimes Dance Dance Revolution.

As of 2022 he lives in Vancouver, British Columbia.

References and notes

1985 births
American expatriates in Canada
Living people
Sportspeople from New York City
People from San Jose, California
American esports players
Canadian esports players
Fighting game players
Evil Geniuses players
Empire Arcadia players
Echo Fox players
Marvel vs. Capcom players
Street Fighter players
Tekken players
Soulcalibur players
American people of Chinese descent
Canadian people of Chinese descent
Team Razer players